National Netball League may refer to one of several netball leagues. These include:

Australia
 Australian Netball League 
 Australian State Netball League
 Commonwealth Bank Trophy
 Esso/Mobil Superleague  
 Suncorp Super Netball

New Zealand
 ANZ Premiership
 National Netball League (New Zealand)

See also
 ANZ Championship